Admiral William Morier (25 September 1790 – 29 July 1864) was a British naval officer.

Early life
He was born at Smyrna on 25 September 1790, the fourth son of Isaac Morier, British consul-general at Constantinople. He was educated at Harrow School.

Career
Morier was an officer in the British Navy.

Personal life
He married Frances Lee "Fanny" Bevan, daughter of the banker, David Bevan.

Death
He died at Eastbourne on 29 July 1864.

References

1790 births
1864 deaths
People educated at Harrow School
Bevan family
William